Kallang Theatre is a 1,744-seat theatre in Kallang, Singapore. Located at 1A Stadium Walk, Singapore 397689 within the Singapore Sports Hub, beside Leisure Park Kallang and Stadium MRT station, Kallang Theatre is managed by Sport Singapore.

Originally opened on 23 February 1970 as the "Kallang Cinema", it was the largest cinema in Singapore at the time. The venue was later transformed into a live performance theatre in the wake of the National Theatre closure. In March 1986, the National Theatre Trust relocated to Kallang Theatre.

Aside from hosting cultural events, Kallang Theatre also became the venue of the annual National Day Rally. From 1986 to 2000, former Prime Ministers Lee Kuan Yew and Goh Chok Tong held their rallies at Kallang Theatre.

See also
Kallang

References

Kallang
1970 establishments in Singapore
Theatre in Singapore
Theatres completed in 1970